Christianity is a minority religion in Laos. Christians in Laos number 200,000 to 210,000, with 150,000 for Protestants and 50 to 60 thousands for Catholics, based on rough estimates conducted by LFND in 2015. This number rose as the 1995 census account Christians in Laos, as many as 60,000 people. There are three major Churches in Laos: the Roman Catholic Church, the Lao Evangelical Church, and the Seventh-day Adventist Church. The Laotian government repressed all activities of religion from 1975 to 1989. Religious practice resumed to be permitted after the Party held a congress and released two new doctrinea called as chintanakan mai or new thinking and kanpianpeng mai or renovation. Laotian religious freedom began increasing in 2000s, when the government started opening the dialogue up with United Nations and numerous organisations.

Catholicism 

The Roman Catholic Church is officially recognized by the Lao Front for National Development (LFND). Initially brought by Italian missionaries in seventeenth century but was left dormant for sometimes, Roman Catholicism's mission entered Laos again when Laos was a French colony in late nineteenth century, especially after 1893 when French colonial government decided to protect Catholic missionaries across Laos. There are approximately 50 to 60 thousands Catholics in 2015, risen from 45,000 Catholics in 2007, many of whom are ethnic Vietnamese, concentrated in major urban centers and surrounding areas along the Mekong River in the central and southern regions of the country. The Catholic Church has an established presence in five of the most populous central and southern provinces, and Catholics are able to worship openly. The Catholic Church's activities are more circumscribed in the north. There are four bishops, two located in Vientiane and others located in the cities of Thakhek and Pakse.

One of the two bishops resident in Vientiane oversees the Vientiane Diocese and is responsible for the central part of the country. The second bishop resident in Vientiane is the Bishop of Luang Prabang. He is assigned to the northern part of the country, but while the Government did not permit him to take up his post, it did permit him to travel to visit church congregations in the north. The church's property in Luang Prabang was seized after 1975, and there is no longer a parsonage in that city. An informal Catholic training center in Thakhek prepared a small number of priests to serve the Catholic community. Several foreign nuns temporarily serve in the Vientiane diocese.

There are no dioceses in the country, but it is divided into four Apostolic vicariates: the Vicariate Apostolic of Luang Prabang, the Vicariate Apostolic of Paksé, the Vicariate Apostolic of Savannakhet, and the Vicariate Apostolic of Vientiane.

Protestantism 

Approximately 400 Protestant congregations conduct services throughout the country for a community that has grown rapidly in the past decade. Rough estimate Protestants to number as many as 150,000.

Many Protestants are members of ethnic Mon-Khmer groups, especially the Khmu in the north and the Brou in the central provinces. Numbers of Protestants have also expanded rapidly in the Hmong and Yao communities. In urban areas, Protestantism has many lowland Lao followers. Most Protestants are concentrated in Vientiane Municipality, in the provinces of Vientiane, Sainyabuli, Luang Prabang, Xiangkhouang, Bolikhamsai, Savannakhet, Champassak, and Attapeu, as well as in the former Xaisomboun Special Zone, but smaller congregations are located throughout the country.

The LFND officially recognizes only two Protestant groups – the LEC and the Seventh-day Adventist Church – and requires all non-Catholic Christian groups to operate under one of these organizations. Seventh-day Adventists number slightly more than 1,000 country-wide, with congregations in Vientiane Municipality as well as Bokeo, Bolikhamsai, Champassak, Luang Prabang, and Xieng Khouang provinces.

Christian denominations that have some following in the country, but which are not recognized by the government, include the Methodists, Church of Christ, Assemblies of God, Lutherans, Baptists, Jehovah’s Witnesses and the Church of Jesus Christ of Latter-day Saints. Official membership numbers are not available.

All approved Christian religious groups own properties in Vientiane Municipality, although some of their properties are not officially recognized by the Government. In addition, the Protestant LEC maintains properties in the cities of Savannakhet and Pakse. Three informal churches, one for English-speakers, one for Korean-speakers, and one for Chinese-speakers, serve Vientiane's foreign Protestant community.

In 2005, a Protestant church in Savannakhet Province was closed down by the government. Among the Hmong of Laos 20% were Christians in 1998. With around 300 congregations, Protestantism has grown rapidly in the last decade. Members of the Seventh-day Adventist Church in Laos are mainly Chinese and Meos. At the end of 30 June 2019 it had four churches and 1,419 members.

Religious freedom
According to the US government and other agencies there have been instances of the Laotian government attempting to make Christians renounce their faith, and have several times closed down Christian churches. They also say that there are two religious prisoners in Laos, both members of the Lao Evangelical Church, and that in 2005, a church in Savannakhet Province was closed down by the government. In 2010 Amnesty International called for the government to allow freedom of speech.

References

Bibliography

External links
http://www.gcatholic.org/dioceses/data/countryLA.htm
https://web.archive.org/web/20130421035058/http://www.adherents.com/adhloc/Wh_180.html#443
Amnesty International